Savannah Smith Boucher (born October 28, 1943), known professionally as Savannah Smith before 1985, is an American actress originally from Springhill, Louisiana. Her younger sister, Sherry Boucher, is a former actress who was the third wife of actor George Peppard.

Extended Family
Boucher is descended from a line of Louisiana Democratic politicians. Her mayor-father’s first cousin, Drayton Boucher, was a member of both houses of the Louisiana State Legislature, having served from 1936 to 1952. Her maternal uncle, John D. Herrington, also served as Springhill mayor — from 1978–86, and again from 1995-2006. as of 2004.

Another sister of Sherry's and Savannah's, Jessica Boucher, was a session musician in the 1980s, most famous for being a duet partner of Merrill Osmond.

Partial filmography

 Five Days from Home (1978) as 'Georgie' Haskin
 North Dallas Forty (1979) as Joanne Rodney
 The Long Riders (1980) as Zee
 The Oklahoma City Dolls (TV movie, 1981) as Darla Guthrie
 Waltz Across Texas (1982) as Molesta Davis
 Sweet Revenge (TV Movie - 1984) as Anne Haggarty Cheever
 Love on the Run (TV movie, 1985) as Martha
 Odd Jobs (1986) as Loretta & Lynette
 Everybody's All-American (1988) as Darlene Kiely
 Meet the Applegates (1990) as Dottie
 Eating (1990) as Eloise
 The Whereabouts of Jenny (TV movie, 1991)
 Fatal Instinct (1993) as Woman Juror
 Last Summer in the Hamptons (1995) as Suzanne
 Graduation Night (2003) as Mrs. Quigley
 Nursie (2004) as Ada

References

External links
 

1943 births
Actresses from Louisiana
American film actresses
American television actresses
Springhill High School (Louisiana) alumni
People from Springhill, Louisiana
Living people
21st-century American women